Forty Acres may be:

40 Acres (album), the 1999 release from Caedmon's Call
Forty acres and a mule, a term for compensation that was supposedly to be awarded to freed slaves after the American Civil War
RKO Forty Acres, a former film studio backlot
Forty Acres is the nickname of the original "College Hill" located within the Campus of The University of Texas at Austin
The Forty Acres, the United Farm Workers compound founded by Cesar Chavez and designated a National Historic Landmark